Gish is a surname. Notable people with the surname include:

Annabeth Gish (born 1971), American actress 
Dorothy Gish (1898–1968), American actress
Duane Gish (1921–2013), American biochemist and prominent creationist
Lillian Gish (1893–1993), American silent film actress
Lou Gish (1967–2006), British actress
Oliver Holmes Gish (1883–1987), American geophysicist
Sheila Gish (1942–2005), British actress
Sidney Gish (born 1997), American musician
Warren Gish, American computational biologist